Jorge Peñaloza (21 February 1922 – 31 January 1987) was a Chilean footballer. He played in eight matches for the Chile national football team from 1946 to 1947. He was also part of Chile's squad for the 1946 South American Championship.

References

External links
 

1922 births
1987 deaths
Chilean footballers
Chile international footballers
Place of birth missing
Association football forwards
Colo-Colo footballers